Ahmed Jumaa (born 2 January 1986) is an Emirati footballer. He currently plays for Regional as a forward .

Career
He formerly played for Al-Wahda, Al-Jazira, Al-Wasl, Al-Shaab, Ittihad Kalba, Dubai, and Al Urooba.

References

External links
 

1986 births
Living people
Emirati footballers
Al Wahda FC players
Al Jazira Club players
Al-Wasl F.C. players
Al-Shaab CSC players
Al-Ittihad Kalba SC players
Dubai CSC players
Al Urooba Club players
UAE Pro League players
UAE First Division League players
UAE Second Division League players
Association football forwards
Place of birth missing (living people)